This list of University of Iowa faculty includes past and present instructors, researchers, and administrators at the University of Iowa.

Administration
 Carl Seashore dean of the graduate college 1908–37
 Dewey Stuit dean of the College of Arts from 1948 to 1977

Humanities
 Timothy Barrett papermaker and paper-making researcher. 2009 MacArthur Fellow.
 Hans Breder artist, founder of the Intermedia department, served as Professor 1966–2000.
 Chunghi Choo (born 1938) jewelry designer and metalsmith
 Frank Conroy author, former head of Iowa Writers' Workshop
 Philip Greeley Clapp director of school of music 1919–53
 Linda Crist - Associate Emeritus Professor - labanotationist
 George De La Pena actor  Associate Professor of Dance
 Robert Dick former visiting professor of flute 2002–03
John Dilg (born 1945), artist and professor in the School of Art and Art History (1975–2017)
 Hualing Nieh Engle novelist, co-founder and former director of the International Writing Program.
 Paul Engle poet and director of the Iowa Writers' Workshop for 24 years. Engle also founded the International Writing Program.
 Carrie Figdor Associate Professor of Philosophy and philosopher of mind
 Nicholas Johnson former FCC commissioner 1966–1973, U.S. Maritime Administrator. Professor, Department of Communication Studies and founding member of the Iowa Progressive Caucus.
 Douglas W. Jones electronic voting reform expert and cofounder of the Open Voting Consortium , Professor of Computer Science
 Mauricio Lasansky renowned printmaker, creator of The Nazi Drawings
 Erik Lie Associate Professor of Finance, Henry B. Tippie Research Fellow. Discovered the stock options backdating scandal
 Kembrew McLeod media activist and prankster
 Philip Roth 1960 National Book Award winning author of Goodbye, Columbus, taught creative writing
 Wiley B. Rutledge United States Supreme Court Justice; Dean of College of Law, 1935–1939
Palagummi Sainath visiting instructor in International Programs. An award-winning Indian development journalist described as one of the world's greatest experts on famine and hunger.
 George Seifert former assistant football coach 1966, and former head coach of NFL San Francisco 49ers
 Phil Stong Writing Instructor, author of the novel State Fair and others
Bohumil Shimek naturalist and conservationist whom the Shimek State Forest is named after
 C. Vivian Stringer former women's basketball coach who is only coach in NCAA history to take three different teams to final four.
 Phebe Sudlow first female professor at the University of Iowa
 Basil Thompson  former ballet master of the Joffrey Ballet and artistic director of the Milwaukee Ballet.
 James Van Allen physicist and discoverer of two radiation belts (the Van Allen Belts) that surround the earth, Emeritus Carver Professor of Physics
 Kurt Vonnegut, Jr. American novelist and satirist, Iowa Writers' Workshop faculty 1965–66
 Himie Voxman alumnus, director of the School of Music from 1954–80
 Christine Whelan visiting assistant professor of Sociology, author of Why Smart Men Marry Smart Women
 Grant Wood American painter who painted American Gothic, instructor and director of WPA art projects

Sciences
 Nancy C. Andreasen alumna and psychiatrist, 2000 National Medal of Science Recipient, Andrew H. Woods Chair of Psychiatry, Director of the Psychiatric Iowa Neuroimaging Consortium
Kevin Campbell muscular dystrophy scientist, Investigator for the Howard Hughes Medical Institute  and Professor and Head of Department of Molecular Physiology & Biophysics
Samuel Calvin–(1840–1911) pioneering geologist.
 Zada Mary Cooper (1875–1961) - alumna and pharmacist - assistant, instructor, assistant professor, and associate professor. Founder of Kappa Epsilon and Rho Chi
 Antonio Damasio neurologist  former M.W. Van Allen Professor and Head of Neurology 1989–2004, Director of USC Institute for the Neurological Study of Emotion and Creativity
 Robert V. Hogg 1950 Ph.D. in mathematics and professor of Statistics from 1951–2001, former President of the American Statistical Association.
 Wendell Johnson (1904–1965) former head of the Department of Speech Pathology and Audiology; Pioneer in the field. See http://nicholasjohnson.org/wjohnson/
 Everett Franklin Lindquist developer of the ITBS and ACT exams.
 Donald Gurnett Physicist 
 Charles F. Lynch Epidemiologist
 George Willard Martin noted mycologist. Head of the Department of Botany from 1953 to 1955.
 Ignacio Ponseti physician internationally known for non-surgical treatment of clubfoot
 J. Roger Porter chair Dept. of Microbiology 1949–1977, internationally known microbiologist
 David W. Murhammer Professor of Chemical and Biochemical Engineering
 Aliasger K. Salem Professor and Head of Division of Pharmaceutics and Translational Therapeutics, College of Pharmacy
 Ingo Titze University of Iowa Foundation Distinguished Professor, Department of Speech Pathology and Audiology and the School of Music; Executive Director of the National Center for Voice and Speech, centered at the Denver Center for the Performing Arts; father of vocology, a specialty within speech-language pathology; creator of Pavorobotti, a singing (voice simulation) robot featured on National Public Radio

Sports
 Steve Alford men's head basketball coach 1999-2007
 Sam Barry former Iowa basketball coach (1922–1929), and Iowa baseball coach (1923–24) is only coach to have coached teams both to the Final Four and to the College World Series.
Beth Beglin - head field hockey coach 1988-1999
Francis X. Cretzmeyer - head men's and women's cross country and men's and women's track and field coach 1948-1977
Forest Evashevski - head football coach 1952-1960
Kirk Ferentz head football coach 1999–present
Hayden Fry head football coach 1979-1998. Inducted into the College Football Hall of Fame
Dan Gable - head wrestling coach 1976-1997
Pops Harrison - head basketball coach 1942-1950
Ralph Miller - head basketball coach 1964-1970
 Lute Olson head basketball coach 1974–1983
 Otto Vogel - head baseball coach 1925-1942; 1946-1966

University of Iowa Presidents 
Amos Dean  1855–59
Silas Totten  1859–62
Oliver M. Spencer  1862–67
Nathan Ransom Leonard (acting)  1867–68; (acting) 1870-71
James Black  1868–70
George Thacher  1871–77
Christian W. Slagle (acting)  1877–78
Josiah Little Pickard  1878–87
Charles Ashmead Schaeffer  1887–98
Amos Noyes Currier (acting)  1898–99
George Edwin MacLean  1899–1911
John Gabbert Bowman  1911–14
Thomas Huston Macbride  1914–16
Walter Albert Jessup  1916–34
Eugene Allen Gilmore  1934–40
Chester Arthur Phillips (acting)  1940
Virgil Melvin Hancher  1940–64
Howard Rothmann Bowen  1964–69
Willard L. Boyd  1969–81
Duane C. Spriestersbach (acting)  1981–82
James O. Freedman  1982–1987
Richard D. Remington (acting)  1987–1988
Hunter R. Rawlings III  1988–1995
Peter E. Nathan (acting)  1995
Mary Sue Coleman  1995–2002
Willard L. Boyd (interim)  2002-2003
David J. Skorton  2003–2006
Gary Fethke (interim)  2006–2007
Sally Mason  2007–2015
Jean Robillard (interim)  2015
Bruce Harreld 2015–2021
Barbara J. Wilson 2021 to present

References